PageDefrag is a program, developed by Sysinternals (now distributed by Microsoft), for Microsoft Windows that runs at start-up to defragment the virtual memory page file, the registry files and the Event Viewer's logs (files such as AppEvent.Evt, SysEvent.Evt, SecEvent.Evt and so on).

Overview
Using PageDefrag may improve performance. Since PageDefrag only affects a few files, it takes a relatively short time to run when compared to entire-disk defragmenters such as Windows Defrag, so long as the page file is not fragmented. If the page file is fragmented, PageDefrag can take as long or longer than Windows Defrag.

PageDefrag does not defragment the contents of the registry files, only the placement of these files on the hard drive. Other utilities such as NTREGOPT can optimize the registry files.

PageDefrag runs on Windows NT 4.0, Windows 2000, Windows XP, and Windows Server 2003.  Though the website erroneously says "runs on Windows XP (32-bit) and higher (32-bit), Windows Server 2003 (32-bit) and higher (32-bit)", the tool cannot defragment the pagefile on Windows Vista, Windows 7, or Server 2008; it is able to defragment registry hives on these versions.  Workarounds for higher versions of Windows, including 64-bit versions, include using a BartPE disk or booting from a Windows install CD and using the provided command line interface.

See also
Defragmentation
List of defragmentation software

References

Further reading
Winternals: Defragmentation, Recovery, and Administration Field Guide by Dave Kleiman, Laura Hunter, Mahesh Satyanarayana, Kimon Andreou, Nancy G Altholz, Lawrence Abrams, Darren Windham, Tony Bradley and Brian  (2006) - Syngress

External links
 

Defragmentation software
Windows-only freeware
Utilities for Windows